Robyn Ann Layton  is an Australian lawyer, who worked in a diverse range of legal roles, including as a judge of the Supreme Court of South Australia and judge of the South Australian Industrial Court. She was author of the South Australian Child Protection review known as "the Layton report" in 2003, and a member and then chair of the International Labour Organization's Committee of Experts on the Application of Conventions and Recommendations from 1993 to 2008.

Career

Education
Layton studied law at the University of Adelaide, graduating in 1967 with a bachelor of laws.

Early career
Layton had a diverse practice as a solicitor, working in criminal, industrial and family law. She also did pro bono work for people opposed to the Vietnam war, both conscientious objectors and demonstrators. Her criminal law work included representing Aboriginal people, again pro bono. Her work for Aboriginal and Torres Strait Islander people expanded to the Central Aboriginal Land Rights team.

Layton was appointed to the South Australian Industrial Court in 1978, before accepting a position as a Deputy President of the Commonwealth Administrative Appeals Tribunal from 1985 until 1989.

In 1992, she was appointed a Queen's Counsel, following her return to the bar. In 1993 she was appointed a member of International Labour Organization's Committee of Experts on the Application of Conventions and Recommendations, a position she held until 2008, including time as the first female chair.

From 1993 to 2008, Layton served as a member and later chair of the Committee of Experts on Application of Conventions of the International Labour Organization (ILO) in Geneva, and since then has served as a consultant to the organisation.

2003 Layton report
In 2002 the South Australian government commissioned Layton to review child protection laws to more effectively prevent child neglect and abuse and to improve the outcomes for children who had been neglected or abused. In 2003 Our best investment: a state plan to protect and advance the interests of children, known as the "Layton Report", was published  This work focussed particularly on inter-agency co-ordination; services to families and youth; young people under guardianship of the Minister; adolescents at risk, children and young people with disabilities and Aboriginal issues.

Supreme Court of South Australia

On 14 February 2005 Layton became the fourth woman appointed to the Supreme Court and with Margaret Nyland and Ann Vanstone formed the first all female Court of Criminal Appeal in South Australia. She retired from the Court on 3 September 2010.

Subsequent work

Layton has been chair of the South Australian Sex Discrimination Board and the Human Rights Committee of the Law Society of South Australia.

Since 2010 Layton has continued to advocate for Indigenous, refugee and children's rights, working as the team leader for an Asian Development Bank in Kazakhstan, Cambodia and the Philippines to reduce poverty for women and improve employment opportunities.

In 2013 she spent time at Delhi University , running workshops on Advocacy for law students.

From 2013 to 2014, Layton chaired an Independent Review Panel which undertook a review of the APY Land Rights Act 1981, which aimed to improving the governance of the Anangu Pitjantjatjara Yankunytjatjara Lands. The process included consultation with Anangu by visiting the APY Lands and convening 24 meetings, before presenting a report to the then Minister for Aboriginal Affairs and Reconciliation in April 2014. The findings of the report led to the Anangu Pitjantjatjara Yankunytjatjara Lands Rights (Miscellaneous) Amendment Act 2016.

, Layton is Chair of the Advisory Council for the University of South Australia’s Australian Centre for Child Protection and Adjunct Professor at the University's School of Law. She is patron of several organisations, including the Women’s Legal Services SA and the Migrant Resource Centre.

Honours

Layton was made an Officer of the Order of Australia on 26 January 2012 "For distinguished service to the law and to the judiciary, particularly through the Supreme Court of South Australia, as an advocate for Indigenous, refugee and children's rights, and to the community". She was also recognised as the "South Australian of the Year" in 2012.

Personal life
Layton married John Bannon in 1968. They had one daughter before they divorced.

References

Living people
Judges of the Supreme Court of South Australia
Australian women judges
Australian King's Counsel
1945 births
Officers of the Order of Australia